Legimin Raharjo (born 10 May 1981 in Medan, North Sumatra) is an Indonesian former footballer who plays as a midfielder. People often called him by his nickname Gimin. He took part in the Indonesian national team during the 2007 Asian Cup, with most of his time being spent on the bench. His parents name are Harjo Sunarto (father) and Suharsini (mother). His footballing influence is Paul Scholes and his favourite club is Manchester United.

Honours

Club honours
PSMS Medan
 Bang Yos Gold Cup: 2004, 2005, 2006
 Piala Kemerdekaan: 2015
 Liga 2 runner-up: 2017

References

External links
 
 Legimin Raharjo at Soccerway

1981 births
Living people
Sportspeople from Medan
Indonesian footballers
PSMS Medan players
Persik Kediri players
Arema F.C. players
Liga 1 (Indonesia) players
Indonesian Premier League players
Association football midfielders
Indonesia international footballers